A salt pig is a container used to hold salt, to make it easily accessible to pinch or spoon measure into dishes. They are available in many materials, but are generally ceramic, porcelain, earthenware or clay.
The earthenware construction of a salt pig can help keep the salt from clumping in humid kitchens.
According to the blog Mundane Essays, a blog in which writer Muness Alrubaiehis researched the origin of the term "salt pig," the use of "pig" is found in Scots and northern English dialect meaning an earthenware vessel.

References 

Food storage containers
Kitchenware